Abū Saʿīd Abān ibn ʿUthmān ibn ʿAffān (died 105 AH/723 CE) was a muhaddith, faqīh, mufassir, Muslim historian. He also served a seven-year stint as governor of Medina in 695–702, during the reign of the Umayyad caliph Abd al-Malik.

Biography 
Aban was a son of Uthman, the third Rashidun caliph. His mother was Umm Amr bint Jundab ibn Amr al-Dawsiyya of the Azd tribe of Yemen. During the First Fitna, which occurred in the wake of his father’s assassination, Aban fought alongside the forces of A'isha and his Umayyad kinsmen against Caliph Ali (r. 656–661) at the Battle of the Camel in November 656. As A'isha's supporters were on the verge of defeat, Aban fled the battle. Later, the Umayyad caliph Abd al-Malik (r. 685–705) appointed Aban governor of Medina in 695 and he continued in the post until being replaced by Hisham ibn Isma'il al-Makhzumi in 702. During his term, he led the funeral prayers, as was customary of the governor, for Muhammad ibn al-Hanafiyya, a son of Ali and leader of the Alid family.

He became incapacitated in 722/23 and died in Medina the following year, in 723/24, during the reign of Caliph Yazid II. Aban does not appear to have been a major political operative of the Umayyads and owes most of his fame for his knowledge of Islamic tradition. He is credited by a number of scholars for authoring the Maghazi (biography) of Muhammad, though the historians Yaqut al-Hamawi and Ahmad al-Tusi credit this work to a certain Aban ibn Uthman ibn Yahya.

Descendants 
Aban had at least two wives. His first, Umm Sa'id bint Abd al-Rahman, a granddaughter of al-Harith ibn Hisham, belonged to the Banu Makhzum clan. She mothered two of Aban's sons, his eldest Sa'id and Abd al-Rahman, and a daughter. His second wife, Umm Kulthum bint Abd Allah was a granddaughter of Ja'far ibn Abi Talib. The names of the descendants of Aban have been recorded in the historical record up to at least 1375 in Egypt, where some of his descendants moved. Others are recorded in the sources in al-Andalus, including his grandson Uthman ibn Marwan and the latter's great-grandson Muhammad ibn Abd al-Rahman ibn Ahmad.

See also 
Amr ibn Uthman, elder full brother of Aban
Sa'id ibn Uthman, paternal half-brother of Aban
Abd Allah ibn Uthman, paternal half-brother of Aban

References

Bibliography 
 

Year of birth unknown
723 deaths
Hadith scholars
Children of Rashidun caliphs
Sunni Muslim scholars of Islam
Umayyad governors of Medina
Umayyad dynasty
7th-century Arabs
8th-century Arabs
Tabi‘un hadith narrators
8th-century historians of the medieval Islamic world